Brittney Marie Karbowski (born ; June 26, 1986) is an American voice actress who has voiced in a number of English-language versions of Japanese anime series for Funimation, Sentai Filmworks and ADV Films.

Early life
Karbowski was born on June 26, 1986 in Sugar Land, Texas. She graduated Kempner High School in 2004 and attended University of Houston briefly where she majored in theater.

Career           

Karbowski started her acting career in theater productions such as Little Shop of Horrors, Seussical, and Pirates of Penzance in Houston, Texas. While playing Janet in a local stage production of The Rocky Horror Show, she was noticed by a director from ADV Films. Her start into the anime business occurred in 2004, when she was asked to be an extra in the series Gantz. By December 2006 she stated that Fuko from Gilgamesh was her favorite dub as she thought the character was "cute and wicked, but wicked in a good way". She eventually received starring roles as Himeko Katagiri in Pani Poni Dash and as Aoba Tsuzaki in Jinki: Extend through her work at ADV Films. Karbowski started voicing for Funimation in 2007 with a starring role as Mai in Itsudatte My Santa!. She also expanded her voice acting to other venues when she voiced her first video game character in 2007 as Pinkun in Akiba's Beat. ADV Films ultimately ceased operations in 2008, and several properties were transferred to Funimation. It was also during this time that she voiced the lead heroine Ayu Tsukimiya in Kanon after the title transfer had taken place. Karbowski has since dubbed dozens of characters including both major and minor roles through Funimation.

Karbowski has also had roles in films such as Celie in Up & Down, Susie in Puncture and a backpack girl in The Starving Games. She was slated to be a lead character Zax in the science fiction Code of Evil. Karbowski starred in the 2014 horror film Atrocity.

Personal life
Karbowski was briefly hospitalized with a broken neck in 2010 due to a car accident.

She married Matthew Hernandez on October 11, 2013.

Filmography

References

External links

 
 
 
 
 Local voice actress Brittney Karbowski takes us behind the microphone at KPRC-TV via YouTube

1986 births
Funimation
Living people
Actresses from Texas
American voice actresses
American people of Polish descent
People from Sugar Land, Texas
21st-century American actresses
University of Houston alumni
Kempner High School alumni